Mike Fox (foaled 2004 in Caledon, Ontario) is a Canadian Thoroughbred racehorse best known as the upset winner of Canada's most prestigious race, the Queen's Plate, in 2007.

In winning the Queen's Plate aboard Mike Fox, jockey Emma-Jayne Wilson became the first female rider to ever win the race in its one hundred and forty eight runnings.

Pedigree

References
 Mike Fox's pedigree and partial racing stats

2004 racehorse births
Racehorses bred in Ontario
Racehorses trained in Canada
King's Plate winners
Thoroughbred family 19